Caleb Hunter Plant (born July 8, 1992) is an American professional boxer who held the IBF super middleweight title from 2019 to 2021. 

As of November 2021, he is ranked as the world's third-best active super middleweight by the Transnational Boxing Rankings Board, ESPN, and The Ring, and sixth by BoxRec.

Personal life
Plant's daughter, Alia Plant, suffered an unknown medical condition that caused seizures. Alia died in January 2015, at the age of 19 months after she caught a respiratory infection which developed to pneumonia.

In March 2019, his mother, Beth Plant, was shot by police after pulling a knife on an officer. She later died in a hospital.

Plant is married to Jordan Plant, a Fox Sports reporter. They met in 2016 and were married in November 2019.

Amateur career
Caleb Plant took up boxing at age 8. He won the 2011 Golden Gloves in the light heavyweight division. Plant was an alternate for the 2012 Summer Olympics. As an amateur Caleb won numerous tournament titles while compiling a record of 97 wins with 20 defeats.

Professional career

Early career
Plant made his professional debut on May 10, 2014, when he was scheduled to fight Travis Davidson. He won the fight by a first-round knockout, ending the fight after just 47 seconds. He won his next eight fights, five of them by stoppage. Plant won his next two fight against Jamar Freeman and Tyrone Brunson by decision, before scoring another two knockouts against Adasat Rodriguez and Carlos Galvan.

Plant fought Juan De Angel on August 23, 2016. It was the first ten round fight in Plant's career. He won the fight by a convincing unanimous decision, with all three judges scoring the fight 100-89 in his favor.

Plant fought Thomas Awimbono in the main event of PBC on FOX, on February 25, 2017. Plant beat Awimbono by unanimous decision, with scores of 100–89, 100–89 and 99–90.

Plant fought Alan Campa on September 8, 2017. Campa later withdrew from the bout, for undisclosed reasons, and was replaced by Andrew Hernandez. The fight was Plant's Showtime Championship Boxing debut. Plant completely dominated his opponent, with the judges awarding him every single round of the fight.

Plant, at the time the #6 ranked IBF super middleweight was scheduled to fight the #12 ranked Rogelio Medina, on February 17, 2018. The was an IBF super middleweight eliminator for the number #2 ranking slot, as well as for the position of the IBF mandatory title challenger. Plant utilized his jab to score points and accumulate damage on the advancing Medina, while using his superior ring-craft to stay out of Medina's punching range. Plant won the fight by a wide unanimous decision, with scores of 120–108, 119–109, 117–111.

IBF super middleweight champion

Plant vs. Uzcátegui
In his 18th professional fight, Plant was scheduled to challenge the reigning IBF super middleweight champion José Uzcátegui, on January 13, 2019. Uzcátegui was the former interim IBF super middleweight champion, and was later elevated to full champion when James DeGale vacated his title. It was Uzcátegui's first title defense. Plant was the IBF mandatory, having earned the right to challenge for the title after defeating Rogelio Medina by unanimous decision. The fight was later postponed, as Plant suffered a broken left hand in training camp. Plant needed surgery to repair the injury followed by rehabilitation. While Plant was recovering from his injury, Uzcátegui beat Ezequiel Maderna by unanimous decision, in a non-title bout contested on September 28, 2018. His fight with Uzcátegui was rescheduled for January 13, 2019. The eleven month layoff from his bout with Medina was the longest in Plant's professional career. Plant came into the bout as a +161 underdog, while Uzcátegui was a -200 favorite to defend the title.

Plant got off to a great start, managing to score a knockdown in the second round. He had caught the off-balanced Uzcátegui with a left hook, which dropped the champion to the canvas. After sustaining a cut outside his right eye in the third round, Plant would once again knock the champion down with a left hook in the fourth round. Sticking to his outfighting gameplan, Plant remained dominant until the ninth round, during which he was staggered by a short uppercut from Uzcátegui. After losing both the ninth and tenth rounds, Plant made a comeback in the eleventh round. Plant won the fight by unanimous decision, with scores of 116–110, 116–110 and 115–111. Plant out-landed Uzcátegui by 217 to 157 punches, landing more jabs and power shots along the way.

Plant vs. Lee
Plant made his first IBF title defense against Mike Lee, on July 20, 2019. Lee had spent his career competing at light-heavyweight, but moved down to super middleweight to challenge for his first world championship. The fight was scheduled as the lead-in for the Manny Pacquiao vs. Keith Thurman pay-per-view. As Lee was moving down from light-heavyweight, and considering he had never faced the level of opposition that Plant had, Lee wasn't seen as a serious threat to Plant. Accordingly, Plant came into the bout as a -1944 favorite, while Lee was a +1119 underdog.

Plant completely dominated his opponent throughout the bout, earning a technical knockout victory midway through the third round. Plant knocked Lee down after just 37 seconds into the first round, and out-landed the challenger 18–3. Plant staggered Lee with a body shot in the second round, and increased the number of landed shots to 41, compared to Lee's seven. Plant knocked his opponent down three times in the third round: the first knockdown came after Plant landed a right straight, the second after a left hook, while the third knockdown was once again the result of a right straight. Referee Robert Byrd decided to stop the bout at the 1:29 minute mark. Lee's domination was such that The Ring magazine declared him a "glorified club fighter".

Plant vs. Feigenbutz
For his second title defense, Plant fought the #3 ranked IBF super middleweight and mandatory challenger Vincent Feigenbutz, on February 15, 2020. The fight was scheduled as the main event for PBC on Fox, and was Plant's first fight in his native Nashville. Feigenbutz was seen as yet another easy opponent for Plant, with The Athletic stating it would be "hard to envision Plant having much trouble defusing Feigenbutz's offense and then finding a rhythm and turning the bout into target practice". Plant came into the bout as an overwhelming favorite.

Plant justified his role as the favorite, winning by a tenth-round technical knockout, after dominating Feigenbutz through all ten rounds leading up to the knockout. Plant, the longer and taller fighter, utilized his jab to keep the shorter Feigenbutz at distance. After establishing his jab, Plant landed power shots to both the body and head of his opponent. Referee Malik Waleed finally stepped in at the 2:23 minute mark of the tenth round, deeming Feigenbutz unable to continue intelligently defending himself. Afterward, Feigenbutz said: "I can't disagree with the stoppage. The referee did a very good job".

Plant vs. Truax

Plant made his third title defense against the former IBF super middleweight titleholder Caleb Truax, on January 30, 2021. It was the second consecutive time that Plant headlined a PBC on Fox event. Truax was seen as a step-up in competition, compared to Plant's last two opponents. However, many fans expressed their disappointment with the match-up, as it was expected that Plant would fight Canelo Álvarez in a super middleweight title unification bout. Regarding the Canelo fight, Plant said in a pre-fight interview: "my manager Luis DeCubas just felt like with that being five weeks away, which is about four weeks of training, he just felt like a fight of that magnitude that he didn't want to pull the trigger on it".

Plant dominated the fight by outboxing Truax from a distance, while Truax tried unsuccessfully to get closer and force the action at close range. Truax suffered a bruise and a cut by the end of the fourth round. In the fifth, Truax upped the pressure, but Plant used his jab punch to stay out of trouble. Round eight saw Truax connect with a troublesome right to Plant's jaw, while Plant tried to get a knockout win in the ninth, becoming a bit more aggressive. In the twelfth and final round, Truax, seemingly sensing he needed a knockout to win the fight, threw punches from all angles in an effort to land a knockout punch, but Plant did not get hurt. After the scheduled twelve rounds of fighting were over, Plant was announced as winner by unanimous decision, the three judges scoring the bout by 120–108 in his favor, meaning he won all twelve rounds on each of the judges' scorecards.

Plant vs. Álvarez

Plant fought the reigning WBA (Super), WBC, WBO and The Ring super middleweight champion Canelo Álvarez in a title unification bout on November 6, 2021 at the MGM Grand Garden Arena in Paradise, Nevada, United States. The winner of the bout was set to become the first undisputed super middleweight champion in boxing history. Plant entered the bout as an underdog for the first time since his fight with José Uzcátegui, with most odds-makers having him as a +550 underdog. Plant lost the bout via eleventh round technical knockout losing the IBF title, with the loss also being the very first in his professional career. At the time of the stoppage, Plant was behind on all three scorecards with 98–92, 96–94, and 97–93. Plant earned a $10 million guaranteed purse, plus 40% of the PPV proceeds.

Post championship career

Plant vs. Dirrell
Plant was booked to face the former two-time WBC super middleweight champion Anthony Dirrell in a WBC super middleweight title eliminator, on the undercard of the Deontay Wilder vs. Robert Helenius heavyweight bout, which took place at the Barclays Center in New York City. It was broadcast as part of a FOX Sports PBC pay-per-view on October 15, 2022. Plant knocked out Dirrell in the ninth round with an emphatic left hook to the head, before immediately celebrating by miming digging his opponent's grave while Dirrell was receiving medical attention, as he still remained motionless on the canvas. Although referee Harvey Dock was quick to attempt to prevent Plant from celebrating in this manner, Plant continued to mime grave-digging.

Plant vs. Benavidez
On November 3, 2022, Plant and David Benavidez both revealed that they had agreed terms to face each other. The fight was scheduled as the main event of a Showtime pay-per-view, which is expected to take place on March 25, 2023, at the MGM Grand Garden Arena in Las Vegas, Nevada.

Professional boxing record

Amateur kickboxing record
{{Kickboxing record start|norec=y|title=Amateur Kickboxing Record|record=37 Wins (16 (T)KO's), 8 Losses}}
|- style="background:#cfc;"
| 2013-13-30 || Win ||align=left| Scott Legus || International Kickboxing Federation || Mounds View, Minnesota, United States || Decision (Unanimous) || 5 || 3:00
|-
! style=background:white colspan=9 |
|-
|- style="background:#cfc;"
| 2010-07-25 || Win ||align=left| Richie Plant || 2010 IKF World Classic Amateur Championships, Tournament Final || Orlando, Florida, United States || TKO || 1 || 2:59
|-
! style=background:white colspan=9 |
|-
|- style="background:#cfc;"
| 2010-07-24 || Win ||align=left| David Bourne || 2010 IKF World Classic Amateur Championships, Tournament Semifinal || Orlando, Florida, United States || Decision (Unanimous) || 3 || 3:00
|-
|- style="background:#cfc;"
| 2010-07-23 || Win ||align=left| Shawn Dahl || 2010 IKF World Classic Amateur Championships, Tournament Quarterfinal || Orlando, Florida, United States || TKO || 1 || 1:43
|-
|- style="background:#cfc;"
| 2009-10-09 || Win ||align=left| Rob Burbridge || USA vs. UK: World Championship Kickboxing || Minneapolis, Minnesota, United States || Decision (Split) || 5 || 3:00
|-
! style=background:white colspan=9 |
|-
|- style="background:#fbb;"
| 2009-07-26 || Loss ||align=left| Simon Buettner || 2009 IKF World Classic Amateur Championships, Tournament Final || Orlando, Florida, United States || Decision (Unanimous) || 3 || 3:00
|-
! style=background:white colspan=9 |
|-
|- style="background:#cfc;"
| 2009-07-25 || Win ||align=left| Joseph Corneroli || 2009 IKF World Classic Amateur Championships, Tournament Semifinal || Orlando, Florida, United States || Decision (Unanimous) || 3 || 3:00
|-
|- style="background:#cfc;"
| 2009-07-24 || Win ||align=left| Kevin Pearson || 2009 IKF World Classic Amateur Championships, Tournament Semifinal || Orlando, Florida, United States || KO || 1 || 1:40
|-
|- style="background:#cfc;"
| 2007-08-12 || Win ||align=left| Devin Ward || 2007 IKF World Classic Amateur Championships, Tournament Final || Orlando, Florida, United States || TKO || 3 || 0:50
|-
! style=background:white colspan=9 |
|-
| colspan=9 | Legend''':

Pay-per-view bouts

Professional boxing

See also
List of world super-middleweight boxing champions

References

External links

Biography at IKF Kickboxing
Caleb Plant - Profile, News Archive & Current Rankings at Box.Live

1992 births
Living people
American male boxers
Boxers from Tennessee
People from Ashland City, Tennessee
Super-middleweight boxers
World super-middleweight boxing champions
International Boxing Federation champions
National Golden Gloves champions